Francisco Galdós Gauna (born May 6, 1947 in Lasarte, Álava) is a Spanish former professional road racing cyclist. He finished second in the 1975 Giro d'Italia and 1979 Vuelta a España, third in 1972 Giro d'Italia, sixth in the 1976 Tour de France, and fourth in the 1977 Tour de France. He finished in the top 10 of eleven Grand Tours, including three podium finishes.

Major results

1968
 1st  Overall Vuelta a Cantabria
1969
 2nd Overall Vuelta a Cantabria
 3rd Overall Vuelta a La Rioja
 8th Overall Critérium du Dauphiné Libéré
1970
 2nd Overall Volta a Catalunya
 3rd GP Villafranca de Ordizia
 6th Overall Vuelta a España
 9th Overall Tour de France
1971
 4th Overall Giro d'Italia
 6th Druivenkoers Overijse
 10th Overall Tour of the Basque Country
1972
 1st Trofeo Masferrer
 2nd Overall Vuelta a Cantabria
 3rd Overall Giro d'Italia
 3rd GP Pascuas
1973
 2nd Overall Vuelta a La Rioja
 2nd GP Villafranca de Ordizia
 3rd Subida a Arrate
 4th Overall Tour de Suisse
 7th Trofeo Masferrer
 9th Overall Giro d'Italia
1975
 1st  Overall Tour de Romandie
1st Stage 4 
 1st Subida a Arrate
 2nd Overall Giro d'Italia
1st  Mountains classification
1st Stage 21 
 5th Overall Setmana Catalana de Ciclisme
 6th Tour du Haut Var
 7th Road race, National Road Championships
 9th Overall Tour of the Basque Country
 10th Overall À travers Lausanne 
1976
 1st  Overall Vuelta a Cantabria
1st Stage 2b
 6th Overall Tour de France
1977
 1st  Overall Vuelta a Cantabria
1st Stage 2
 3rd Overall Escalada a Montjuïc
 4th Overall Tour de France
 8th Overall Volta a Catalunya
 8th GP Villafranca de Ordizia
 10th Road race, National Road Championships
 10th Subida a Arrate
1978
 1st  Overall Vuelta a La Rioja
 2nd Overall Volta a Catalunya
1st Stage 5 
 3rd Overall Critérium du Dauphiné Libéré
 4th Overall Escalada a Montjuïc
 7th Overall Tour de France
 7th Overall Tour de Suisse
 7th Subida a Arrate
1979
 2nd Overall Vuelta a España
 3rd Overall Critérium du Dauphiné Libéré
1980
 8th Overall Vuelta a España

Grand Tour general classification results timeline

External links

1947 births
Living people
Sportspeople from Vitoria-Gasteiz
Cyclists from the Basque Country (autonomous community)
Spanish Giro d'Italia stage winners
Spanish male cyclists